Zhao Baotong (1928 in Fushun, Liaoning - 2003) was a MiG-15 pilot of the People's Republic of China. He was a flying ace during the Korean War, with 9 victories.

A member of the 3rd Fighter Aviation Division, He was the first Chinese Korean War pilot to achieve ace status. Also known as Chao Bao Tun.

All Chinese aces have received the title Combat Hero in acknowledgement of their services.

See also 
List of Korean War flying aces

References

Sources 

Chinese Korean War flying aces
People from Fushun
1928 births
2003 deaths